The 2013 Taroii Open de Tênis was a professional tennis tournament played on clay courts. It was the first edition of the tournament which was part of the 2013 ATP Challenger Tour. It took place in Itajaí, Brazil between 8 and 14 April 2013.

Singles main draw entrants

Seeds

 1 Rankings are as of April 1, 2013.

Other entrants
The following players received wildcards into the singles main draw:
  Eduardo Dischinger
  Rogério Dutra da Silva
  Guilherme Hadlich
  Bruno Sant'anna

The following players received entry from the qualifying draw:
  André Ghem
  Máximo González
  Jozef Kovalík
  Axel Michon

Doubles main draw entrants

Seeds

1 Rankings as of April 1, 2013.

Other entrants
The following pairs received wildcards into the doubles main draw:
  Ricardo Hocevar /  Eduardo Russi
  João Lucas Menezes /  Leonardo Telles
  Alexandre Schnitman /  João Walendowsky

Champions

Singles

 Rogério Dutra da Silva def.  Jozef Kovalík, 4–6, 6–3, 6–1

Doubles

 James Duckworth /  Pierre-Hugues Herbert def.  Guilherme Clezar /  Fabrício Neis, 7–5, 6–2

External links
Official Website

Taroii Open de Tenis
Taroii Open de Tênis